Vanda ustii, the University of Santo Tomas' vanda, is an orchid species found only in the Philippines. It is named after the University of Santo Tomas or U.S.T.

References

External links 
 The Internet Orchid Species Photo Encyclopedia: Vanda ustii

ustii
Endemic orchids of the Philippines
Epiphytic orchids
Plants described in 2000